"Lift" is a song by the English rock band Radiohead released in 2017. It was first performed in 1996; bootleg recordings were widely circulated, and it became a fan favourite. Radiohead recorded versions of "Lift" during the sessions for their third album, OK Computer (1997), but abandoned it. The guitarist Ed O'Brien said the band had felt pressured by its commercial potential, and the drummer, Philip Selway, said it did not represent what Radiohead wanted to say at the time.

Critics described "Lift" as anthemic and "Britpop-like". In 2017, Radiohead released a version recorded during the OK Computer sessions on the reissue OKNOTOK 1997 2017, followed by a music video. It received positive reviews, though some critics found it inferior to the bootlegged performances. Further versions recorded during the OK Computer period were released on the 2019 compilation MiniDiscs [Hacked] and received more positive reviews.

History 
Radiohead first performed "Lift" on March 14, 1996, at the Troubadour in West Hollywood. They performed it more than 30 times that year while supporting Alanis Morissette on her Jagged Little Pill tour. Journalists noted "Lift" as a highlight and possible future single. According to the guitarist Ed O'Brien, the audience responded warmly to the song: "Suddenly you'd see them get up and start grooving. It had this infectiousness." A bootleg recording was widely circulated, and "Lift" became a fan favourite.

Radiohead recorded "Lift" during the sessions for their third album, OK Computer (1997), but it went unreleased. According to the drummer, Philip Selway, Radiohead felt it was "fey" and not "what we wanted to say about ourselves as a band at the time". In 1999, O'Brien dismissed it as "bogshite", and said the band were "very happy to leave [it] off the album ... There wasn't any stage where it was a key track for any of us." Asked why the song could have worked in live performance but not in the studio, O'Brien said Radiohead had not worked hard on it, and that if a song did not come together quickly they would move on. The singer, Thom Yorke, said Radiohead had settled on playing it in "a certain way that didn't work", and that it became impossible to rearrange. 

In 2017, O'Brien said that Radiohead had felt pressured by the song's commercial potential:If that song had been on that album, it would've taken us to a different place, and probably we'd have sold a lot more records—if we'd done it right. And everyone was saying this. And I think we subconsciously killed it. If OK Computer had been like a Jagged Little Pill, it would've killed us. But "Lift" had this magic about it. But when we got to the studio and did it, it felt like having a gun to your head. There was so much pressure.

From their 2000 album Kid A, Radiohead shifted away from conventional rock music. O'Brien described "Lift" as an "epic" song similar to the 1996 Manic Street Preachers single "A Design for Life", and said that Radiohead no longer produced that kind of music. In 2002, Radiohead performed "Lift" in a slower, more restrained arrangement, which Pitchfork described as "a somber, almost queasy affair". O'Brien and the guitarist Jonny Greenwood later dismissed this version as inferior. In 2003, O'Brien said: "The spirit of the song was there in '96 ... And we're not in that place at the moment." 

In 2015, Greenwood suggested that Radiohead had worked on "Lift" again, describing it as a "management favourite". He likened the situation to "Nude", a song released on Radiohead's seventh album In Rainbows (2007) but written years earlier.  "Lift" remained a fan favourite. Pitchfork wrote that it came to "hold an important place in Radiohead lore", and according to Rolling Stone it was, for decades, the "great white whale" for Radiohead fans.

Release 
In June 2017, Radiohead released "Lift" on the OK Computer reissue OKNOTOK 1997 2017, alongside two other previously unreleased tracks: "I Promise" and "Man of War". The version of "Lift" was recorded at Chipping Norton Recording Studios in February 1996, while the band were recording demos for OK Computer. In 2019, hours of recordings made during the OK Computer sessions, including more versions of "Lift", were leaked online; in response, Radiohead released the recordings as the compilation MiniDiscs [Hacked].

Composition 
Spin described "Lift" as a Britpop-like ballad, and Rolling Stone described it as "one of the last vestiges of [Radiohead's] anthemic, Britpop hooks before the band embarked on a darker path with OK Computer". According to Pitchfork, the song is "strummy and steadily building, with yearning vocals".

The lyrics describe a man who has been rescued from a malfunctioning lift. Pitchfork likened its themes to the OK Computer single "No Surprises", and interpreted the lyric "Today is the first day of the rest of your days" as "a death sentence ... the hapless soul inside it is doomed to expire soundlessly in the intestines of some soulless corporate edifice".

Music video 
On 12 September 2017, Radiohead released a music video for "Lift" directed by Oscar Hudson, featuring Yorke taking an unusual journey in a lift. The video features cameos from Yorke's daughter and his girlfriend Dajana Roncione, and references older Radiohead videos, with appearances from characters from the "Paranoid Android" and "Karma Police" videos. Pitchfork named it the 14th-best music video of 2017.

Reception 
Jamie Atkins, reviewing OKNOTOK for Record Collector, wrote that "Lift" was "an undeniably brilliant alt rock song, with surprising echoes of the grandstanding, otherworldly melancholy of prime Smashing Pumpkins". Guardian critic Alexis Petridis said it had "an immense, air-punch-inducing chorus", and that it would have been a "huge" hit had Radiohead released it. Pitchfork critic Jayson Greene described it as "a lovely, weightless strummer of a song".

Several critics felt the version released on OKNOTOK was lacking. Rolling Stone wrote that it was "restrained, decelerated and boasting an uncharacteristically blasé Yorke vocal take" and did not match the "magnitude" of the live bootlegs. Spin critic Andy Cush felt it was "strangely neutered, with drums that patter instead of exploding with energy", and that the widely circulated 1996 bootleg remained "canonical". Fellow Spin writer Winston Cook-Wilson agreed that the bootlegs were "a bit more staggering", but wrote that this was "a testament to the band's remarkable pop sense at the time – an inclination they, for their own neurotic reasons, quickly moved to complicate or subvert".

Following the 2019 release of MiniDiscs [Hacked], Pitchfork critics Greene and Jeremy D Larson wrote that it had a superior version of "Lift": "It's not mixed very carefully, but it sounds scrappy and untamed, like the band is pushing it into the red unselfconsciously. It lives up to the myth." Rolling Stone considered this version the "crown jewel" of the release and "well worth" the price of purchase. The Guardian wrote that this "satisfying" version would likely have pleased EMI had Radiohead released it as the first OK Computer single, but that it was "ultimately a conservative song and feels like a path the band were right to fork from".

Personnel

Radiohead
Colin Greenwood 
Jonny Greenwood 
Ed O'Brien
Philip Selway
Thom Yorke

Additional musicians
Chris Blair – mastering
Nigel Godrich – production, engineering
Jim Warren – production, engineering

References

2017 songs
Radiohead songs
Song recordings produced by Nigel Godrich
Songs written by Thom Yorke
Songs written by Jonny Greenwood
Songs written by Colin Greenwood
Songs written by Ed O'Brien
Songs written by Philip Selway